The second season of Saravanan Meenatchi began airing on 21 October 2013 and finished on 15 July 2016. It consisted of 700 episodes.

Plot
Season 2 begins with Shakthi Saravanan, son of Saravanan and Meenatchi, coming to India from Canada to find a bride like his mom. He comes to his mom's village Kallidaikurichi in Tirunelveli where his maternal uncle, Tamizh, and family live. Shakthi Saravanan disguises himself and lives in Tamizh's house where he meets Tamizh's daughter, Thanga Meenatchi, and falls for her. After all oppositions from Tamizh, ultimately she too falls for Shakthi Saravanan. Tamizh is strongly against Thanga Meenatchi and Sakthi Saravanan's love due to tensions between the families in the previous generation. Because of this, Tamizh decides to marry his daughter Thanga Meenatchi to his other sister Sudha's son Saravana Perumal a.k.a. Vettaiyan.

Shakthi Saravanan promises to save Thanga Meenatchi from the wedding and Vettaiyan promises not to marry her if Saravanan comes. Unfortunately, he never shows up (he gets deported back to Canada because of his visa expiration) and Vettiyan and Meenatchi get married. Meenatchi develops a strong hatred towards Vettiyan because of this sudden marriage. Meenatchi meets a guy at her college named Inba who promises to take her to Canada to meet Saravanan. His real intention is to kidnap her and rape her. Vettaiyan saves Meenatchi from Inba and his gang, and Vettaiyan himself promises Meenatchi that he will take her to Canada and unite her with Saravanan. They get really close and Meenatchi starts developing feelings for Vettaiyan without even realizing it. Although Meenatchi develops feelings for Vettaiyan, she tries to deny it.

She decides to break ties with Vettaiyan if she wants to live with Saravanan. When  Meenatchi is on the way to the temple to break all ties with Vettaiyan, she meets with an accident and loses her memory.

Meenatchi meets Vettaiyan again and starts to develop feelings for him not remembering their marriage or her previous love with Shakthi Saravanan. Vettaiyan and Meenatchi start dating, and Vettaiyan hides the truth about Saravanan from Meenatchi. Soon Meenatchi gets to know that Vettaiyan is her husband and goes home to happily live with him.

Then she learns about her past with Shakthi Saravanan and is angry with Vettaiyan. After learning more about the sacrifices and hardships Vettaiyan faced for and because of her, she heartily accepts him and they start to live together. After a few months, they bump into a lady who shares Meenatchi's name and appearance, beginning season 3.

Cast
Main

Recurring

Awards and nominations
Season two was also awarded 'Best Male Actor' to Kavin, 'Best Female Actor' to Rachitha, 'Best Comedian' to Nandhini, 'Best Director' to Praveen Bennett, and 'Best Serial' at Vijay Television Awards 2015.

See also
 Saravanan Meenatchi
 Saravanan Meenatchi (season 3)

References

External links
Official Website at hotstar

2013 Tamil-language television seasons
Star Vijay original programming
Tamil-language television shows